The 1992 Fordham Rams football team was an American football team that represented Fordham University during the 1992 NCAA Division I-AA football season. Fordham tied for last in the Patriot League. 

In their seventh year under head coach Larry Glueck, the Rams compiled a 1–9 record. Mark Blazejewski and Tony Iasiello were the team captains.

The Rams were outscored 222 to 141. Their 1–4 conference record tied for fifth the six-team Patriot League standings -- their best result yet in three years of league play. Fordham's sole victory of 1992, over fellow cellar-dweller Bucknell, was its first Patriot League conference win since joining the league in 1990.

Fordham played its home games at Jack Coffey Field on the university's Rose Hill campus in The Bronx, in New York City.

Schedule

References

Fordham
Fordham Rams football seasons
Fordham Rams football